The Ups and Downs of a Handyman is a 1976 British comedy film directed by John Sealey and starring Barry Stokes, Sue Lloyd and Bob Todd. Its alternative titles at various times have been Confessions of a Handyman, Confessions of an Odd-Job Man and The Happy Housewives.

Plot
After his wife inherits a cottage in the countryside, her husband takes up a job as the local handyman, but soon becomes entangled with the women of the village.

Cast
 Barry Stokes as Bob
 Gay Soper as Maisie
 Sue Lloyd as The Blonde
 Bob Todd as Squire Bullsworthy
 Valerie Leon as Redhead
 Chic Murray as P.C. Knowles
 Robert Dorning as Newsagent
 Penny Meredith as Margaretta
 Helli Louise as Newsagent's Daughter
 John Blythe as Farmer Elgin
 Harold Bennett as Gasper
 Julia Bond as Polly
 Jeannie Collings as Mrs Wain
 Alexandra Dane as Mrs Knowles
 Ava Cadell as Schoolgirl
 Pauline Letts as Mother
 Nita Lorraine as Jenny Elgin
 Olivia Syson as Mrs. Bullsworthy
 Jannette Carrol as Barmaid

Critical reception
The Radio Times noted "another cheap-and-cheerful sex comedy in the vein of Timothy Lea's naughty bestsellers. Barry Stokes brings a certain cheeky charm to the title role, while Gay Soper, Sue Lloyd and Valerie Leon find him plenty to do around the house. What little comedy there is comes from Benny Hill stalwart Bob Todd, as the local magistrate, and Chic Murray, as a harassed bobby. Derrick Slater's script is one long smutty gag, while John Sealey's direction is perfunctory at best."

References

External links

1975 films
1970s sex comedy films
1970s English-language films
British sex comedy films
Golan-Globus films
1975 comedy films
1970s British films